Hof am Leithaberge is a town in the district of Bruck an der Leitha in Lower Austria in Austria.

Geography
Hof am Leithaberge lies in the industrial area of Lower Austria. Die About 36.74 percent of the municipality is forested.

References

Cities and towns in Bruck an der Leitha District